Viduja (also Romanized as Vīdūjā; also known as Vīdjā and Vīdujāh) is a village in Golab Rural District, Barzok District, Kashan County, Isfahan Province, Iran. At the 2006 census, its population was 947, in 286 families.

References 

Populated places in Kashan County